Masahito is a male Japanese name, that has been used for members of The Japanese Imperial Family. Although written romanized the same way, the kanji can be different.

Masahito may refer to:
 , later Emperor Go-Shirakawa (後白河天皇)
 , eldest son of Emperor Ōgimachi (正親町天皇)
, the youngest son of Emperor Shōwa of Japan
, Japanese professional wrestler
, Japanese baseball player
, Japanese footballer
, Japanese footballer
, Japanese rugby union player

Japanese masculine given names